Dmitry Vladimirovich Shumkov was a Russian lawyer, businessman, public figure and a billionaire.  In 2012 Shumkov was named the Lawyer of the Year award winner, which is the highest honour for lawyers in the Russian Federation. The award was established by the Edict of the President of the Russian Federation on 8 October 2009.  Shumkov was listed as having been among the Top 10 lawyers of the Russian Federation.

Education and academic career

 1999 – Ph.D.  thesis on "The system of bodies of state power within the subjects of the Russian Federation"
 2002 – Ph.D. thesis on "Social and legal foundations for the sovereignty of the Russian Federation". Academic adviser: Janghir Abbasovich Kerimov, an Associate Member of the Russian Academy of Sciences

Shumkov was a professor at the university in the department of Public Administration and Legal Coverage of Civil and Municipal Services (RANEPA), a scientific adviser at the Institute for Energy Law at Kutafin Moscow State Law University, a Presidium Member of the Association of Lawyers of Russia, the Chairman of the Energy Law Regulation Commission of the Association of the Russian Lawyers, and a member of Research and Consulting Council at the General Prosecutor’s Office of the Russian Federation. He authored more than 100 academic papers.

Life and professional career 
During the 1990s, Shumkov worked for the prosecution authorities of the Russian Federation. After leaving the civil service, he founded the legal firm Pravokom, which later merged with Yurakademia: Kutafin & Partners, and was restructured into Law Group with Shumkov as the Chairman of the Partnership Committee. It was the first Russian law firm to have been entitled to conduct international transactions on behalf of the Government of the Russian Federation (giving legal advice on provisions concerning the following issues; government securities distribution at Russian and international capital markets; cooperation between the Ministry of Finance of the Russian Federation and international rating agencies; the arrangement of export and financial credit loans for foreign borrowers; regulation of foreign sovereign borrowers’ accounts and management of Russian sovereign wealth funds.)

In 2006 Shumkov together with Oleg Kutafin, a member of the Russian Academy of Sciences, initiated the establishment of centers of pro bono legal assistance. As of 1 July 2015, 756 standing centers have been founded in Russia, where during 2011-2015 free qualified legal assistance was provided to more than 400 000 people.

Within the framework of the project Shumkov sponsored the construction and instrumentation of two situation centers of legal initiatives at Lomonosov Moscow State and Kutafin Moscow State Law universities, by means of his charity fund. The fund also sponsored the legal clinic of Saint Petersburg State University.

From 2012 until his death in late 2015, Shumkov was the Chairperson of the Council of the Centre of Legal Initiatives (CLI). In accordance with the Russian Federation Presidential Decree of 17 July 2012 №1796, the functions prescribed to the CLI include the collection and generalization of suggestions for improvement of the Civil Code of the Russian Federation together with presenting monthly reports on their achievability to the President.

Shumkov initiated a project of opening centers for studying Russian law abroad. From the early 2000's Shumkov invested in various development projects. One of such projects was reconstruction of a number of buildings in Kitaigorodsky proezd and Varvarka street. They constitute a significant part of the unique park Zaryadye, which is being constructed on the site of the former hotel Rossiya.
 
Shumkov was a co-owner of the Moscow Olympic Stadium (Olimpiyskiy).

Professional engagement 
From 1992 to 1999, Shumkov worked for the prosecution authorities of the Russian Federation.

In 1999, he founded the legal firm Pravokom, which provided legal services to leading companies in the fuel and energy sector.

From 1999 until his death in late 2015 he was a professor at the Russian Presidential Academy of National Economy and Public Administration (RANEPA) in the department of Public Administration and Legal Coverage of Civil and Municipal Services.

In 2005 the legal firms Pravokom and Yurakademia: Kutafin & Partners merged into the law firm known as "Law Group", wherein Shumkov became the Chairman of the Partnership Committee.

Law Group was selected as the only consulting body to perform legal support during the restructuring of the First Government Corporation Russian Corporation of Nanotechnologies into Rosnano open joint-stock company. Law Group represented such leading Russian companies as Sberbank, Gazprom, and the state corporation Rostekhnologii.

Shumkov’s charity fund also financed the modern equipment placed at the facilities of the legal clinic of Saint Petersburg State University.

From 2012 until his death Shumkov was the Chairperson of the Council of the Centre of Legal Initiatives (CLI).

The CLI was established in accordance with the Russian Federation Presidential Decree of 17 July 2012 №1796 at the premises of some of the leading academic institutions of the Russian Federation, namely; the Law Department of the Moscow State University (MSU), the Law Department of Saint Petersburg State University (SPBGU), the Kutafin Moscow State Law University (MSAL) and the Urals State Law University (USLA). The functions prescribed to the CLI include the collection and generalization of suggestions for improvement of the Civil Code of the Russian Federation together with presenting monthly reports on their achievability to the President. Among the members of the CLI Council are also listed: professor V.V. Blazheev, the principal of Kutafin Moscow State Law University (MSAL), professor A.K. Golitchenkov, the dean of the Law Department of the Moscow State University (MSU), professor N.A. Sheveleva, the dean of the Law Department of Saint Petersburg State University (SPBGU), and V.A. Bublik, the principal of the Urals State Law University (USLA).

On December 3, 2013, Russian President Vladimir Putin held a meeting with Shumkov, the Chairperson, and the members of the Council of the CLI, who are the heads of the top legal institutions and departments. Shumkov presented the progress of the CLI concerning the collection and generalization of suggestions for the Civil Code of the Russian Federation revision and informed the head of the state about the intention to establish educational centers of Russian law abroad.  Putin offered an appraisal of the work fulfilled and discussed the perspectives of the CLI with its members.

In 2012 Shumkov was the Chairperson of the Board of the 2012 Elections Situation Centre. The Situation Centre was initiated by noted Russian lawyers on the premises of some of the leading academic institutions of the country, namely, the Law Department of the Moscow State University (MSU), the Law Department of Saint Petersburg State University (SPBGU), the Kutafin Moscow State Law University (MSAL) and the Urals State Law University (USLA). The 2012 Elections Situation Centre was run on private donations and was situated at Kutafin Moscow State Law University (MSAL). Young lawyers from all 83 regions performed the functions of election observers at 86, 000 polling stations. More than 500  young lawyers worked at the Situation Centre, where they processed the incoming information and operated the hotline 24/7. Both Russian and international observers appraised the organizational management and pointed out the high-scale engagement of the youth in the nation's activity. Two months prior to, and on the very day of the elections 4 500 inquiries were received at the center, and the observers conducted an immediate meticulous examination of each of them. The installation of a unique system allowed all the reports of proceedings from the polling stations to be streamed online to the Situation Centre’s website on Election Day.

On February 1, 2012, on the first day of the electoral campaign Vladimir Putin, the Chairman of the Government of the Russian Federation and a presidential candidate, was accompanied to the 2012 Elections Situation Centre by Chairperson Shumkov. Mr. Putin praised the organizational management of the Centre highly.

On March 6, 2012, after the end of the work of the electoral campaign Vladimir Putin, the president-elect, visited the Situation Centre again with Shumkov to thank the lawyers for the work done. "There is no doubt that it was of particular importance to guarantee fair election and ensure its transparency. It is vital that the citizens feel that their expression of the will is reflected objectively in the final result. Moreover, since the majority of you are lawyers, I attribute incredible significance to the advancement of our political system and to the consolidation of the Russian statehood," Mr. Putin told the Situation Centre’s employees.

Business activity 
Investments

Shumkov was a high-tech industry investor, in particular through his holding company, the Centre of Internetworking Technologies (CIT), which held shares on the Moscow Internet Exchange. (MSK-IX)

On September 8, 2011, Shumkov presented to Vladimir Putin, the Chairman of the Government of the Russian Federation, the system of management of a modern university, which was carried out in cooperation with JSC Gazprombank. The system received high accolades from the Chairman of the Government of the Russian Federation. "Superb, simply amazing," Vladimir Putin stated.

In September 2012, after the end of the APEC summit meeting held in Vladivostok, Shumkov presented to the President the plant and equipment complex, which was implemented into the Far Eastern Federal University (FEFU). According to the President’s estimates, "FEFU yields to no leading universities in technique".

Development projects

From the early 2000s until his death Shumkov invested in development projects. At the time of his death, he was investing in a large-scale project of the reconstruction of a number of buildings in Kitaigorodsky proezd and Varvarka street. These structures constitute a significant part of the unique Zaryadye Park, which is being constructed on the site of the former hotel Rossiya. In particular, he purchased some buildings in Kitaigorodsky proezd, which borders upon Zaryadye park which is being constructed on the site of the demolished hotel Rossiya. In 2014 Shumkov bought out from the Moscow City Government a group of buildings at Varvarka 14 bldg. 1, 2, which are also in proximity to the future park. According to Moscow authorities, the projects will be able to repay expenditures for Zaryadye Park.

There are plans concerning the launch of a number of museum projects, including, the Ethnographic Museum of Traditional Practices and Cultures of Peoples of Russia, a virtual museum of fortification Russian Forts, and exhibitions dedicated to the history of Zaryadye, the oldest Moscow area. The hotel complex will house an up-to-date media center, a library of Jewish literature and an exhibition devoted to the production of the first feature film Strike by Sergie Eisenstein, which was shot in Kitaigorodsky proezd. All these venues will become the key functional points of the unique Zaryadye park, which is currently being constructed without causing damage to the landscape integrity of the surround.

Shumkov was a co-owner of the Moscow Olympic Stadium (Olimpiyskiy). It is the largest indoor stadium in Europe, and at the time of the 1980 Olympic Games opening ceremony it was the biggest one in the world. The maximum arena capacity is 35 000 spectators. The highest number of world swimming records was set in the Olimpiyskiy swimming pool. Every year the Olimpiyskiy swimming pool alone receives more than one million visitors. In 2009 Olimpiyskiy hosted the prestigious international song contest Eurovision. Over the years music performances by Alla Pugacheva, Beyoncé, Aerosmith, Pink Floyd, Kino, Rammstein, Kylie Minogue, Muse, Shakira, Scorpions and Linking Park, among others have attracted capacity crowds to Olimpiyskiy.

Other activity

Shumkov was a co-owner of the world’s biggest platinum deposit, Norilsk-1 (Russian Platinum).

Philanthropy

Shumkov’s charity fund offers support to legal entities and to individuals in the domains of education, sports, scientific research, and culture. By means of his charity fund, Shumkov subsidized the construction and instrumentation of the two situation centers of legal initiatives at Lomonosov Moscow State and Kutafin Moscow State Law universities. The fund also financed the modern equipment at the facilities of the legal clinic of Saint Petersburg State University.

In 2015 all Russian Greco-Roman, freestyle, and female wrestling winners of the First Baku 2015 European Games received prize money from Shumkov’s charity fund. Shumkov’s charity fund’s events and fundraisers attracted the business elite, chief executives of international and Russian corporations, politicians, and public figures from the cultural sphere, among these have been; Carla Bruni-Sarkozy, Tony Blair, Lucy Churchill Corinna Zu Sayn-Wittgenstein, Natalia Vodianova, Valery Gergiev, the art director of the Mariinsky Theatre; and heads of such news agencies as Associated Press, France Press, Deutsche Welle, Kyodo News and the Xinhua.

Death

On 4 December 2015 Shumkov was found hanged on his tie in his apartment in Moscow.  He was 43.

References

External links 
 - website of Association of Lawyers of Russia (ALRF)
 V.V.Putin briefed on Digital University project at Far East Federal University

1972 births
Russian businesspeople in metals
Russian billionaires
2015 suicides
Suicides by hanging in Russia
Suicides in Moscow
People from Sarapulsky Uyezd
Russian lawyers
Russian philanthropists